"That's What Girls Are Made For" is the debuting single for the American R&B/Soul vocal group The Spinners, released on Harvey Fuqua's Tri-Phi Records label in 1961.

The single featured most of the original members of the group including original lead singer Bobby Smith and featured a very young Marvin Gaye playing drums. Harvey Fuqua and his then-girlfriend Gwen Gordy made the song simply for them to record.

Released nationally on Tri-Phi, the song reached number 27 on the Billboard Hot 100 and number 5 on the Hot R&B Songs chart, starting a long successful run for the group, who later found success with neighboring Detroit label Motown Records in the mid-1960s and Philadelphia soul-based records with Atlantic Records in the 1970s.

Credits
Lead vocals by Bobby Smith
Background vocals by Bobby Smith, George Dixon, Pervis Jackson, Henry Fambrough and Billy Henderson
Drums by Marvin Gaye
Other Instrumentation by Various session artists (including possibly The Funk Brothers)

Chart history

References

1961 debut singles
The Spinners (American group) songs
Songs written by Harvey Fuqua
Song recordings produced by Harvey Fuqua
Songs written by Gwen Gordy Fuqua
1961 songs